Rindge Co. v. County of Los Angeles, 262 U.S. 700 (1923), was a case in which the United States Supreme Court held that a county government could use its power of eminent domain to take land from a private landowner to build a scenic highway.

these roads, especially the main road, through its connection with the public road coming along the shore from Santa Monica, will afford a highway for persons desiring to travel along the shore to the county line, with a view of the ocean on one side, and of the mountain range on the other, constituting, as stated by the trial judge, a scenic highway of great beauty. Public uses are not limited, in the modern view, to matters of mere business necessity and ordinary convenience, but may extend to matters of public health, recreation and enjoyment. Thus, the condemnation of lands for public parks is now universally recognized as a taking for public use. A road need not be for a purpose of business to create a public exigency; air, exercise and recreation are important to the general health and welfare; pleasure travel may be accommodated as well as business travel; and highways may be condemned to places of pleasing natural scenery.

Background 

According to the Adamson House tour guides:
In 1892, Henry Keller sold the  Rancho Topanga Malibu Sequit or 'Rancho Malibu' to Rhoda May Knight Rindge and Frederick H. Rindge, for a price variously reported as $10-$22 per acre. Keller, it is said, had acquired it for 10 cents an acre in 1854. Rindge, from Cambridge, Massachusetts, had recently inherited  an estate of more than $2 million and moved to Los Angeles, California, where he wrote a book called "Happy Days in Southern California." Then he looked for "a farm near the  ocean, and under the lee of the mountain, with a trout brook, wild trees, a lake, good soil, and excellent climate." He found his farm in Malibu Canyon. He described the Malibu coast as the American Riviera.

May Rindge of Trenton, Michigan owned  of ranch land, much of what has been incorporated into the city of Malibu, California. First, the Southern Pacific Railroad tried to take her land, so, according to the city of Malibu:

Upon hearing of the Southern Pacific's plans, Mr. Rindge decided to build a private railroad through his ranch to keep the bigger railroad company out of his domain. A little-known law prevented duplication of an existing railroad line. Before any tracks could be laid, however, Mr. Rindge died. May Rindge became its president and one of the few women ever to become president of a railroad.

The rails were later reused to build Rindge Dam.

Eminent domain

See also
List of United States Supreme Court cases, volume 262
17 Mile Drive – A private scenic road on the California coast some 250 miles north of Malibu on the Monterey peninsula.
Berman v. Parker – A later case (1954) in the Supreme Court regarding the power of eminent domain.
Hueneme, Malibu and Port Los Angeles Railway (The railroad that the Rindges built through Malibu)

References

Further reading

External links

 
Legal Information Institute Annotated Constitution National Eminent Domain Power

United States Supreme Court cases
United States land use case law
1923 in United States case law
Santa Monica Mountains
Malibu, California
History of Los Angeles County, California
Eminent domain
United States Supreme Court cases of the Taft Court